The fifth season of the animated television series, Aqua Teen Hunger Force originally aired in the United States on Cartoon Network's late night programming block, Adult Swim. Season five started on January 20, 2008, with "Robots Everywhere", and ended with "Bible Fruit" on March 23, 2008. Aqua Teen Hunger Force is about the surreal adventures and antics of three anthropomorphic fast food items: Master Shake, Frylock, and Meatwad, who live together as roommates and frequently interact with their human next-door neighbor, Carl Brutananadilewski in a suburban neighborhood in South New Jersey. In May 2015, this season became available on Hulu Plus.

Although ten episodes were produced for season five, only nine episodes aired. An episode entitled "Boston" was scheduled to air as part of season five, but Adult Swim pulled it to avoid further controversy surrounding the 2007 Boston bomb scare. Episodes in season five were written and directed by Dave Willis and Matt Maiellaro. Almost every episode in this season features a special guest appearance, which continues a practice used in past seasons.

Jonah Krakow of IGN has given episodes from this season a range of both positive and negative reviews. Krakow criticized the violent killing of kittens by Master Shake in "Reedickyoulus", saying it was "going too far". The season five finale, "Bible Fruit", lead to the creation of a short lived spin-off series called Soul Quest Overdrive, which later premiered on May 25, 2011, on Adult Swim. This season has been made available on DVD, and other forms of home media, including on demand streaming.

Production
Every episode in this season was written and directed by series creators Dave Willis and Matt Maiellaro, who have both written and directed every episode of the series. Episodes originally aired in the United States on Cartoon Network's late night programming block, Adult Swim. This season was one of the original seasons branded under the Aqua Teen Hunger Force title before Willis and Maiellaro started using a different alternative title for each season in 2011. As with most seasons, several episodes originally aired outside of their production order.

Season five is the first season of the series to be produced in 16:9 high definition. This was the first season to air after the debut of Aqua Teen Hunger Force Colon Movie Film for Theaters, and after the series got national attention from the 2007 Boston Bomb Scare.

"Boston"

An episode satirizing the 2007 Boston Mooninite panic entitled "Boston" was produced to serve as the fifth season premiere. The 2007 Boston bomb scare occurred on January 31, 2007, when various  LED displays resembling Aqua Teen Hunger Force characters Ignignokt and Err were placed in various locations in Boston, Massachusetts, and were mistaken for explosive devices. Subsequently, the entire city was shut down for security purposes, Cartoon Network General Manager and Executive Vice President Jim Samples resigned, and the network's parent company Turner Broadcasting paid $2 million in damages. Adult Swim was forced by Turner Broadcasting's legal department to pull the episode completely. The second episode, "Robots Everywhere" served as the season premiere on January 20, 2008.

During the production of "Boston", executives at Adult Swim were very nervous about the episode leading to further controversy, and Willis and Maiellaro were tasked to re-write the episode; three different versions of "Boston" were ultimately produced. When asked about the episode, Maiellaro stated it is relatively tame in comparison to what South Park creators would have done in a similar situation. Maiellaro stated that it was written as if it was something that could happen in reality, unlike most episodes that mainly focus on surreal plot lines. Willis also mentioned a guest appearance by comedian Paul F. Tompkins, who Willis referred to as an "amazing comedian". Maiellaro has claimed "Boston" is his favorite episode.

An unfinished version of "Boston" was illegally leaked online in 2015. The episode has never been aired or formally released to the public in any format by Adult Swim. Willis has indirectly stated that there are no plans for its formal release at any time in the foreseeable future. During a Reddit AMA in June 2015, Willis expressed his disdain for the unfinished episode being leaked. This marks the first time an episode of the series has been pulled.

Cast
Main cast members in the fifth season consist of Dana Snyder as Master Shake, Carey Means as Frylock, and series co-creator Dave Willis as Meatwad, Carl Brutananadilewski, and recurring character Ignignokt. Season five also featured appearances from recurring voice cast members such as Matt Maiellaro who voiced Markula in the first three episodes to and Err, George Lowe who voiced himself as various characters. Master Shake, Frylock, and Meatwad, who have appeared in ever episode prior, were completely absent in "Sirens"; additionally Master Shake and Frylock only make brief speaking cameos in "Robots Everywhere".

Season five features special guest appearances from various comedians and other celebrities in almost every episode. Paul F. Tompkins appeared in "Boston" as a police officer. Diviya Roney voiced an unnamed woman, and Fred Armisen, Rachel Dratch, Vishal Roney, Diviya Roney, Sam Harrigan, Molly Harrigan, Sadie Willis, Max Willis in voiced various robots in "Robots Everywhere". In "Sirens" Neko Case voiced Chrysanthemum, Kelly Hogan voiced The B.J. Queen, John Kruk voiced himself. In "Hoppy Bunny" Scott Adsit provided the voice of Hoppy Bunny. Vincent Pastore voiced Terry in "Laser Lenses", uncredited. T-Pain and Josh Homme voiced the Dummies in "Dummy Love". Alexander Katz and Scott Luallen both appeared in "The Marines". In "Bible Fruit" David Cross (credited as "Sir Willups Brightslymoore") voiced Bert Banana, H. Jon Benjamin (credited as Jon "the Hammer" Benjamin") voiced Mortimer Mango, and Kristen Schaal (credited as "Frannie Hood") voiced Tammy Tangerine.

Episodes

Reception
The season five episode "Bible Fruit" lead to the creation of a short lived spin-off, Soul Quest Overdrive. In 2010, the pilot episode of Soul Quest Overdrive was released online though Adult Swim's "Big Uber, Network Sampling" feature. Six episodes of the series were ordered, four of them aired back-to-back on May 25, 2011 during Adult Swim's "DVR Theater". The series has not been aired since, leaving two episodes unaired. This would be the third Aqua Teen Hunger Force spin-off behind Spacecataz and Carl's Stone Cold Lock of the Century of the Week.

Jonah Krakow of IGN gave "Robots Everywhere" a 5.5 out 10, which considered "Mediocre", saying "We could get deeply psychoanalytical and say that Carl's confusion and annoyance with the robots is a metaphor for the audience's suffering and the robots are the staff of ATHF doing the torturing". Kraków gave the following episode, "Sirens" an 8, which is considered "Great", saying "Thankfully, this episode was much stronger than last week as Carl and his sexual desires were the focus of the comedy instead of annoying robots". Krakow gave "Couples Skate" an 8.3 and praised the return of Master Shake, Frylock, and Meatwad, calling it a "solid episode". Kraków gave "Reedickyoulus" gave this episode an 8.5, and gave this episode a good review, but said Master Shake killing kittens in a microwave was "going too far". "Hoppy Bunny" was given an 8 by Kraków, who praised this episode for originality saying "Not too many shows out there would touch Furries". Kraków gave "Laser Lenses" a 7, who noted that the episode didn't give any new information or insight about any of the characters saying "They simply ran around, pissed each other off and got themselves into disgusting circumstances. Sometimes, that's good enough". Kraków gave "Dummy Love" a 7.0, and said the episode had funny moments but wasn't as funny as it could be, and that the episode has a lot of potential, which it didn't live up to saying. "The Marines" revived Krakow's lowest score of the season with a 5.5. Krakow said the only funny parts of "The Marines" were Saw parody and the CGI gum commercial funny, saying "Unfortunately, the majority of this episode just didn't work at all. The jokes were old or non-existent, the plot made no sense and Carl wasn't there as an additional source of comedy". Krakow gave "Bible Fruit" the greatest score of the season, 9.5, which is considered "amazing; and gave the episode a good review saying it was a great way to end the season.

Home release

Nine episodes from season five were released on the Aqua Teen Hunger Force Volume Six DVD on December 16, 2008, along with the first four episodes from season six, prior to their original television debuts. The set was released by Adult Swim and distributed by Warner Home Video, and features several special features including the 2007 and 2008 episodes of Carl's Stone Cold Lock of the Century of the Week (then known as I'm Pissed) and commentaries on select episode. The set was released in Region 4 by Madman Entertainment on February 10, 2010. "Robots Everywhere" was originally released as a special feature on the Aqua Teen Hunger Force Zombie Ninja Pro-Am video game on November 5, 2007, months prior to its official television debut on January 20, 2008.

This season was also released under the label "Season 6" on iTunes and the Xbox Live Marketplace in HD and SD, and on Amazon Video under the label "Volume 5".

See also
 List of Aqua Teen Hunger Force episodes
 Aqua Teen Hunger Force

References

External links

 Aqua Teen Hunger Force at Adult Swim
 Aqua Teen Hunger Force season 5 at the Internet Movie Database

2008 American television seasons
Aqua Teen Hunger Force seasons